Paul Wayne Sexton Sr. (born August 5, 1942) was a Republican former member of the North Carolina General Assembly representing the state's sixty-sixth House district, including constituents in Forsyth and Rockingham counties. He was appointed to the seat on July 12, 1993, after Peggy Wilson resigned.  A retiree from Eden, North Carolina, Sexton served six terms until 2005. He was born in Roanoke, Virginia.

Electoral history

2004

2002

2000

References

|-

Living people
1942 births
People from Eden, North Carolina
People from Roanoke, Virginia
University of North Carolina at Chapel Hill alumni
United States Army War College alumni
21st-century American politicians
Republican Party members of the North Carolina House of Representatives